The HP Storageworks XP (XP = eXtended Platform) is a computer data storage disk array sold by Hewlett Packard Enterprise using  Hitachi Data Systems hardware and adding their own software to it.  It's based on the Hitachi Virtual Storage Platform and targeted towards enabling large scale consolidation, large database, Oracle, SAP, Exchange, and online transaction processing (OLTP) environments.

The XP Disk Array family

Used to be called P9000 XP, to match with other disk array products they sold at the time (P2000, P4000, P6000 and P10000).

XP 48
 RAID 0/1 and RAID 5 support
 18 GB 15,000 RPM, 73 GB 10,000 rpm and 181 GB 7,200 rpm Fibre Channel drives
 Crossbar Architecture (3.2 GB/s)
 High capacity scalability—up to 48 disks, 8.7 TB  and 24 host connectivity ports
 up to 16 GiB of battery-protected (48 hours minimum), mirrored write cache

XP 128
 a mixture of disk drives configured as RAID 1 (2D+2D and 4D+4D) and RAID 5 (3D+1P and 7D+1P).
 from 5 drives to 128 for up to 36 TB of usable storage capacity, 4 drives at a time
 heterogeneous connectivity via Fibre Channel, iSCSI, FICON and ESCON
 all the software functionality of the larger XP 1024 with a smaller footprint.
 up to 64 GiB of battery-protected (48 hours minimum), mirrored write cache

XP 256
 RAID 0/1 and RAID 5 support
 from 17 GB to 9 TB of storage space
 connectivity via SCSI (8 to 32 ports) or Fibre Channel (4 to 16 ports)
 up to 16 GiB of battery-protected (48 hours minimum), mirrored write cache

XP 512
 RAID 0/1 and RAID 5 support
 18 GB, 15,000 rpm, 73 GB 10,000 rpm and 181 GB 7,200 rpm Fibre Channel drives
 High capacity scalability—up to 512 disks, 93 TB and 32 host connections
 up to 32 GiB battery-protected, mirrored write cache

XP 1024
 a mixture of disk drives configured as RAID 1 (2D+2D and 4D+4D) and RAID 5 (3D+1P and 7D+1P).
 up to 1024 disk drives for 288 GB to 149 TB raw and 144 TB to 129 TB of usable storage capacity in a single array
 heterogeneous connectivity via Fibre Channel, iSCSI, FICON and ESCON
 up to 128 GiB battery-protected (48 hours minimum), mirrored write cache

XP 10000
 a mixture of disk drives configured as RAID 1 (2D+2D and 4D+4D), RAID 5 (3D+1P and 7D+1P) and RAID 6 (6D+2P)
 up to 240 disk drives for 69 TB of capacity
 virtualization technology provides external storage device support to enable tiered storage up to 16 PB

XP 12000
 OEM product from Hitachi Tagmastore USP 1100
 a mixture of disk drives configured as RAID 1 (2D+2D and 4D+4D), RAID 5 (3D+1P and 7D+1P) and RAID 6 (6D+2P)
 from 9 to 1152 disk drives for 576 GB to over 332 TB of internal capacity
 virtualization technology provides external storage device support to enable tiered storage up to 32 PB
 up to 128 GiB battery-protected (48 hours minimum), mirrored write cache
 double the internal performance of the XP1024

XP 20000
 a mixture of disk drives configured as RAID 1 (2D+2D and 4D+4D), RAID 5 (3D+1P, 7D+1P, 14D+2P and 28D+4P) and RAID 6 (6D+2P)
 up to 240 disk drives for 177 TB of raw capacity
 up to 64 GiB battery-protected (48 hours minimum), mirrored write cache
 virtualization technology provides external storage device support to enable tiered storage up to 96 PB

XP 24000
A mixture of disk drives configured as RAID 1 (2D+2D and 4D+4D), RAID 5 (3D+1P, 7D+1P, 14D+2P and 28D+4P) and RAID 6 (6D+2P)
from 9 to 1152 disk drives for 2.26 PB Raw space. (Used at Cloud At Cost)

P9500
 a mixture of Serial attached SCSI (SAS) and midline SAS disk drives configured as RAID 1 (2D+2D and 4D+4D), RAID 5 (3D+1P, 7D+1P, 14D+2P and 28D+4P) and RAID 6 (6D+2P)
 from 5 - 2048 disk drives for 2 PB of raw capacity
 up to 1 TiB flash-protected (backup will last indefinitely), mirrored write cache
 No entry level model any more - P9500 scales from small to large
 Minimum configuration is a whole rack containing SFF SAS drive chassis, proprietary SSD drive chassis, SAN network controller, cache module, batteries, power supplies, fans, management server
 Based on Hitachi VSP F710I

At some point models are the XP 20000, XP24000 and the P9500.

XP7 
 supports RAID 1, RAID 5 and RAID 6
 supports up to  8PB raw capacity and up to 2304 disks (SFF, LFF, SSD, Flash-Modul SAS)
 up to 2 TiB cache
 up to 247 PB external storage

XP8 
 supports RAID 1, RAID 5 and RAID 6
 supports up to 69PB raw capacity with several disk formats(SFF, LFF, SSD, Flash-Modul SAS, SCM, NVMe SFF)
 up to 6 TiB cache
 up to 255 PB external storage

XP8 Gen2

Notes

External links
HPE XP Storage

XP